Dick Vest (1897-1974) was an Australian rugby league footballer who played in the 1910s and 1920s . An Australian international and New South Wales interstate representative three-quarter back, he played in the New South Wales Rugby Football League Premiership for Sydney's Western Suburbs club.

Playing career
The son of an Austrian immigrant, Vest was born Gregoria Richard Veserema in the country New South Wales town of Barmedman. Following the death of his father in a mine accident, Vest and his two older brothers were sent to a boys home in the Western Sydney suburb Westmead, playing junior rugby league for local club Parramatta. Vest commenced his New South Wales Rugby Football League Premiership first grade career with Western Suburbs in the 1914 NSWRFL season.

During the 1920 Great Britain Lions tour Vest played in all three Tests for Australia as they won the Ashes for the very first time.
He was later selected to go on the 1921–22 Kangaroo tour of Great Britain.
He played for West Wyalong and Barmedman in the Maher Cup.

Death
Vest died at Enfield, New South Wales on 11 June 1974.

References

1897 births
1974 deaths
Australian people of Austrian descent
Australian rugby league players
Western Suburbs Magpies players
Australia national rugby league team players
New South Wales rugby league team players
City New South Wales rugby league team players
Rugby league centres
Rugby league players from New South Wales
Rugby league wingers
Date of birth missing